The 2002 Oregon gubernatorial election took place on November 5, 2002. Incumbent Democratic Governor of Oregon John Kitzhaber was unable to seek a third consecutive term as governor, therefore creating an open seat. To replace him, former Oregon Supreme Court Associate Justice Ted Kulongoski won a crowded and competitive Democratic primary, while former State Representative Kevin Mannix emerged from an equally competitive Republican primary. The campaign between Kulongoski and Mannix, who were joined by Libertarian nominee Tom Cox, was close and went down to the wire. Ultimately, Kulongoski eked out a narrow margin of victory over Mannix, which was slightly smaller than Cox's total vote share, allowing Kulongoski to win what would be the first of two terms as governor.

Democratic primary

Candidates
 Ted Kulongoski, former Oregon Supreme Court Associate Justice, former Attorney General of Oregon,nominee for U.S. Senate in 1980, and nominee for governor in 1982
 Jim Hill, former Oregon State Treasurer
 Bev Stein, chair of the Multnomah County Commission

Campaign
Kulongoski obtained the endorsement of labor unions and the backing of governor Kitzhaber. A poll before the election showed Kulongoski at 40%, ahead of former State Treasurer Jim Hill at 23%, and Bev Stein at 19%. Lesser known candidates standing in the Democratic primary included William Allen, campaigning on the belief that Oregon paid too much money to the federal government and should consider seceding, and Caleb Burns standing to reform Oregon's schools.

Results

Republican primary

Candidates
Kevin Mannix, former Oregon State Representative, 2000 Republican nominee for Attorney General of Oregon
Jack Roberts, Oregon Commissioner of Labor and Industries
Ron Saxton, former Chair of the Portland Public Schools Board
W. Ames Curtright
Robert Weidner, 1998 Constitution Party nominee for Governor of Oregon
Lee R. Shindler

Results

General election

Campaign
Kulongoski focused on education, his support for gay rights and the Oregon Death with Dignity law. Mannix campaigned on his plans to cut taxes to stimulate the economy of Oregon and encouraging partnerships between businesses and colleges. Tom Cox for the Libertarian party and two write in candidates, Richard Alevizos and Gary Spanovich, also stood in the election.

The departure of Kitzhaber, who had opposed plans to build a Columbia Gorge casino, was considered an opportunity for the Confederated Tribes of Warm Springs. Tribes invested record amounts of money into Oregon politics in this race, including $40,000 supporting Kulongoski. Kulongoski did not take a position on the issue during the campaign, but later became a supporter of the plan.

Kulongoski campaigned using a motor home and his many visits to bowling alleys became a trademark of his campaign. Early in the campaign Kulongoski held a large lead over Mannix in the polls but the gap narrowed as the election neared after Mannix put Kulongoski on the defensive. Mannix characterised Kulongoski as a strong tax and spender after he endorsed a proposed $313 million income tax rise to avoid cuts in education and other areas. He also attacked Kulongoski for being soft on crime. A poll in October showed Kulongoski at 45%, only 4 percent ahead of Mannix at 41%.

Mannix conceded the election on 6 November 2002 after Kulongoski secured a decisive lead in the vote count. The Libertarian candidate Tom Cox claimed that he was responsible for Kulongoski's victory as his exit polls suggested he took twice as many Republican votes as Democratic votes.

Predictions

Results

References

2002
Oregon
Gubernatorial